Choeroichthys is a genus of pipefishes of the family Syngnathidae native to the Indian and Pacific Oceans.

Etymology 
The genus name is derived from the Greek  meaning "a pig" and  meaning "fish".

Species
There are currently six recognized species in this genus:
 Choeroichthys brachysoma (Bleeker, 1855) (Short-bodied pipefish)
 Choeroichthys cinctus C. E. Dawson, 1976 (Barred shortbody pipefish)
 Choeroichthys latispinosus C. E. Dawson, 1978 (Muiron pipefish)
 Choeroichthys sculptus (Günther, 1870) (Sculptured pipefish)
 Choeroichthys smithi C. E. Dawson, 1976
 Choeroichthys suillus Whitley, 1951 (Pig-snouted pipefish)

References

External links

 
Taxa named by Johann Jakob Kaup
Marine fish genera